Molly & Gina is a 1994 movie directed by Paul Leder and written by Leder and his son, Reuben. It stars Frances Fisher, Natasha Gregson Wagner, and Peter Fonda. It is also the feature film debut of Elizabeth Berkley. The plot deals with a secretary and an actress who attempt to find the killers of their boyfriends.

External links

1994 films
1990s action films